Live is a 1972 live album by American soul artist Donny Hathaway. It was recorded at two concerts: side one at The Troubadour in Hollywood, and side two at The Bitter End in Greenwich Village, Manhattan based on the guidance of Jerry Wexler.

The album features some traditional soul anthems, such as Marvin Gaye's 1971 hit "What's Going On", but also Carole King's pop standard "You've Got a Friend".

There are two notable solos on the album, one on the track "The Ghetto" by Hathaway on electric piano and another by Willie Weeks on bass on "Voices Inside (Everything Is Everything)", taken from the performances recorded at The Troubadour and at The Bitter End accordingly.

Hathaway's daughter Lalah would record her own live album in 2015 in which she also did "Little Ghetto Boy".

Critical reception

The album received generally positive reviews from music critics. Rolling Stones Mosi Reeves stated "Donny Hathaway swings with vividness on this brilliant live set and the audience responds ecstatically." AllMusic rated the album score of 4.5 out of 5, with John Bush stating the album is "one of the most glorious of his career, an uncomplicated, energetic set with a heavy focus on audience response as well as the potent jazz chops of his group", and that it "solidified Hathaway's importance at the forefront of soul music". In 2015, Live was ranked number 48 on Rolling Stones list of 50 Greatest Live Albums of All Time. In 2005, MusicRadar included it in its list of the 10 essential bass albums.

Track listing

Side one
"What's Goin' On" (Renaldo "Obie" Benson, Al Cleveland, Marvin Gaye) – 5:18 
"The Ghetto" (Donny Hathaway, Leroy Hutson) – 12:08 
"Hey Girl" (Earl DeRouen) – 4:03 
"You've Got a Friend" (Carole King) – 4:34

Side two
"Little Ghetto Boy" (DeRouen, Edward Howard) – 4:29 
"We're Still Friends" (Hathaway, Glenn Watts) – 5:12 
"Jealous Guy" (John Lennon) – 3:08
"Voices Inside (Everything Is Everything)" (Richard Evans, Philip Upchurch, Ric Powell) – 13:47

Personnel
Donny Hathaway – vocals, electric piano, piano, organ, arrangements
Phil Upchurch – lead guitar on side one
Cornell Dupree – lead guitar, backing vocals on side two
Mike Howard – guitar, backing vocals
Willie Weeks – bass, backing vocals
Fred White – drums, backing vocals
Earl DeRouen – conga drums, backing vocals
Technical
Ray Thompson – recording engineer on side one
Tom Flye – recording engineer on side two
Arif Mardin - mixing
Jim Cummins - front cover photography

Charts

Weekly charts

Later Samples
"Little Ghetto Boy"
"Little Ghetto Boys" by Wu-Tang Clan from the album Wu-Tang Forever
"Lil Ghetto Boy" by Dr. Dre from the album The Chronic
"Lil Ghetto Boy" Cover by The Roots and John Legend from the album Wake Up!
'What's Goin On" 
"The Swing Man" by Patrick Lindsey from the album Phonk School

References

Donny Hathaway albums
Albums produced by Arif Mardin
Albums produced by Jerry Wexler
1972 live albums
Atlantic Records live albums
Albums recorded at the Bitter End
Albums recorded at the Troubadour